I Love My Country is a British television comedy panel game shown on BBC One which began airing on 3 August 2013 and finished on 28 September 2013. The show was originally going to be hosted by David Walliams, but after the pilot, he dropped out due to other commitments. Gabby Logan was chosen to host the full series. Frank Skinner and Micky Flanagan act as the team captains, with four celebrities on each team on every episode. On 25 October 2013, it was announced that the show had been axed after the show had attracted largely negative press reviews and struggled in the ratings.

The theme song for the show was "One Vision" by Queen.

Format
The show is based on the Dutch Ik hou van Holland format by Talpa, which has been sold to several countries. Hosted by Gabby Logan, the show features two teams of four well-known celebrities, led by the team captains, Micky Flanagan and Frank Skinner. The aim of the game being to see how much they know about their country (the United Kingdom). Each team member takes part in a series of games and challenges. The team with the most points at the end of the show wins for that episode. The show features live music from a house band fronted by singer Jamelia.

Episode Guide
The coloured backgrounds denote the result of each of the shows:
 – indicates Frank's team won
 – indicates Micky's team won

Scores

Reception
The show received mostly negative reviews from critics. It was described as "a shapeless shambles", "idiot TV at its worst" and "little short of treason". Due to these overwhelmingly negative reviews and bad ratings, the show was subsequently axed by the BBC.

Footnotes

References

External links

2013 British television series debuts
2013 British television series endings
BBC panel games
BBC television comedy
BBC television game shows
British panel games
2010s British game shows
English-language television shows
Television series by ITV Studios
Television series produced at Pinewood Studios
Television game shows with incorrect disambiguation